Kargino is a rural locality (a khutor) in Vokhtozhskoye Rural Settlement, Gryazovetsky District, Vologda Oblast, Russia. The population was 82 as of 2002.

Geography 
Kargino is located 60 km southeast of Gryazovets (the district's administrative centre) by road. Vokhtoga is the nearest rural locality.

References 

Rural localities in Gryazovetsky District